Hajjiabad-e Razveh (also Romanized as Ḩājjīābād-e Raẕveh) is a village in Qohab-e Sarsar Rural District, Amirabad District, Damghan County, Semnan Province, Iran. At the 2006 census, its population was 25, in 7 families.

The Ismaili castle of Gerdkuh is located nearby.

References 

Populated places in Damghan County